Murato may refer to:

People

Dimitar Ilievski - Murato, the first Macedonian summiter of Mount Everest.

Places 

Murato, commune in Haute-Corse department of France.

Other

Murato may also refer to the South American language Candoshi-Shapra.